This is a list of people executed in Kansas.

No one has been executed by the state of Kansas since 1965, although capital punishment is legal there. Historically, 58 people have been executed in the area now occupied by the state. Many of these were federal executions of soldiers and POWs, often at the United States Disciplinary Barracks in Leavenworth.  Fourteen German POWs were executed at Leavenworth in 1945.

The last executions in Kansas were at the Kansas State Penitentiary, when spree killers James Latham and George York were executed for murder in 1965. Except for John Coon, executed in 1853 by firing squad, all federal and state executions in Kansas have been by hanging.  The current method of execution is by lethal injection.

List of people executed in Kansas 

 Notes

See also 

 Capital punishment in Kansas
 Capital punishment in the United States
 Crime in Kansas
 List of death row inmates in Kansas
 Lists of people from Kansas

People executed
People executed
People executed
Kansas